Central African Republic competed at the 2010 Summer Youth Olympics, the inaugural Youth Olympic Games, held in Singapore from 14 August to 26 August 2010.

Athletics

Girls 
Track and Road Events

Basketball 

Boys

References

External links 
 Competitors List: Central African Republic – Singapore 2010 official site

You
Nations at the 2010 Summer Youth Olympics
Central African Republic at the Youth Olympics